Branislav Čonka (born 28 January 1989) is a Serbian football midfielder, who plays for Donji Srem.

References

External links
 
 Branislav Čonka stats at utakmica.rs

1989 births
Living people
People from Inđija
Association football midfielders
Serbian footballers
FK Teleoptik players
FK Banat Zrenjanin players
FK Radnički Nova Pazova players
FK Javor Ivanjica players
FK Inđija players
FK Radnički 1923 players
FK Donji Srem players
Serbian First League players
Serbian SuperLiga players
Serbian expatriate footballers
Expatriate footballers in Slovenia
NK Rudar Velenje players